Melquíades Javier Álvarez Caraballo (born 10 August 1988) is a Spanish swimmer who competed in the 2008 Summer Olympics.

References

External links

1988 births
Living people
Sportspeople from Seville
Spanish male breaststroke swimmers
Olympic swimmers of Spain
Swimmers at the 2008 Summer Olympics
Mediterranean Games gold medalists for Spain
Mediterranean Games medalists in swimming
Swimmers at the 2009 Mediterranean Games